This is a full list  of the 2251 current members of the United States National Academy of Engineering, each of whom is affiliated with one of 12 disciplinary sections. This list does not include deceased members.  In addition there are 206 foreign associates.

 Aerospace Engineering
 See List of members of the National Academy of Engineering (Aerospace)

 Bioengineering
 See List of members of the National Academy of Engineering (Bioengineering)

 Chemical Engineering
 See List of members of the National Academy of Engineering (Chemical)

 Civil Engineering
 See List of members of the National Academy of Engineering (Civil)

 Computer Science & Engineering
 See List of members of the National Academy of Engineering (Computer science)

 Electric Power/Energy Systems Engineering
 See List of members of the National Academy of Engineering (Electric power and energy systems)

 Electronics Engineering
 See List of members of the National Academy of Engineering (Electronics)

 Industrial, Manufacturing & Operational Systems Engineering
 See List of members of the National Academy of Engineering (Industrial, manufacturing, and operational systems)

 Materials Engineering
 See List of members of the National Academy of Engineering (Materials)

 Mechanical Engineering
 See List of members of the National Academy of Engineering (Mechanical)

 Earth Resources Engineering
 See List of members of the National Academy of Engineering (Earth resources)

 Special Fields & Interdisciplinary Engineering
 See List of members of the National Academy of Engineering (Special fields and interdisciplinary)

References

National Academy of Engineering